The following is a list of events affecting Canadian television in 1979. Events listed include television show debuts, finales, cancellations, and channel launches.

Events

Debuts

Ending this year

Television shows

1950s
Country Canada (1954–2007)
CBC News Magazine (1952–1981)
The Friendly Giant (1958–1985)
Hockey Night in Canada (1952–present)
The National (1954–present)
Front Page Challenge (1957–1995)
Wayne and Shuster Show (1958–1989)

1960s
CTV National News (1961–present)
Land and Sea (1964–present)
Man Alive (1967–2000)
Mr. Dressup (1967–1996)
The Nature of Things (1960–present, scientific documentary series)
Question Period (1967–present, news program)
Reach for the Top (1961–1985)
Take 30 (1962–1983)
The Tommy Hunter Show (1965–1992)
University of the Air (1966–1983)
W-FIVE (1966–present, newsmagazine program)

1970s
The Beachcombers (1972–1990)
Canada AM (1972–present, news program)
Canadian Express (1977–1980)
Celebrity Cooks (1975–1984)
City Lights (1973–1989)
Definition (1974–1989)
the fifth estate (1975–present, newsmagazine program)
Grand Old Country (1975–1981)
Headline Hunters (1972–1983)
King of Kensington (1975–1980)
Let's Go (1976–1984)
Live It Up! (1978–1990)
The Mad Dash (1978–1985)
Marketplace (1972–present, newsmagazine program)
Ombudsman (1974–1980)
Parlez-moi (1978–1980)
Second City Television (1976–1984)
This Land (1970–1982)
V.I.P. (1973–1983)
The Watson Report (1975–1981)
100 Huntley Street (1977–present, religious program)

TV movies
Cementhead
Certain Practices
Every Person Is Guilty
Homecoming
Je me souviens / Don't Forget Me
One of Our Own
The Wordsmith

Television stations

Debuts

Network affiliation changes

See also
 1979 in Canada
 List of Canadian films

References